The 2013 UCI Juniors Track World Championships was the 10th annual Junior World Championship for track cycling held at the Sir Chris Hoy Velodrome in Glasgow, Scotland from 7 to 11 August 2013.

The Championships offered medals for a range of race disciplines including Keirin, Sprint, Team sprint, Scratch race, Points race, Madison, Individual time trial, Omnium, Individual pursuit and Team pursuit. 250 competitors from 34 countries entered the Championships for the opportunity to be presented with the coveted rainbow jersey on offer for each event.

Medal summary

Medal table

References

External links

UCI Juniors Track World Championships
Uci Juniors Track World Championships, 2013
Track cycling
UCI Juniors Track World Championships
International sports competitions in Glasgow
International cycle races hosted by Scotland